Caminito de Gloria is a 1939 Argentine musical melodrama film written and directed by Luis César Amadori.   The film starred Libertad Lamarque, who sings "Caminito", the celebrated 1926 tango composed by Juan de Dios Filiberto with lyrics by Coria Peñaloza originally popularized by Carlos Gardel and Ignacio Corsini.  In 1960 Amadori remade this film under the title Mi último tango, starring Sara Montiel in the Lamarque role.

Cast
Roberto Airaldi
Emperatriz Carvajal
Miguel Gómez Bao
Libertad Lamarque
Percival Murray
José Antonio Paonessa
Semillita
Rodolfo Zenner

References

External links
 

1939 films
1930s Spanish-language films
Argentine black-and-white films
1939 romantic drama films
Films directed by Luis César Amadori
Argentine romantic musical films
Argentine romantic drama films
Melodrama films
1930s romantic musical films
1930s musical drama films
Argentine musical drama films
1930s Argentine films